The Mission Sui Iuris of Funafuti (Latin: Missio Sui Iuris Funafutinum) is a Catholic Latin mission sui juris (pre-diocesan missionary jurisdiction) in Tuvalu, Polynesia.

It depends on the Congregation for the Evangelization of Peoples, yet it is exceptionally not exempt, but instead is a suffragan of a Metropolitan archdiocese. Since 21 March 2003, that metropolitan see has been the Archdiocese of Suva; until that date, it had been a different see, i.e., the Archdiocese of Samoa-Apia.

Its only place of worship is Teone Church in Vaiaku, on Fongafale island in Tuvalu.
The current Superior is Reynaldo B. Getalado, M. S. P., appointed in 2014.

History 
Ellice Islands with very few Catholics were united to Gilbert Islands as a protectorate and then British colony Gilbert and Ellice Islands from 1916. The vicariate apostolic of the Gilbert Islands became the Diocese of Tarawa in 1966.
The Diocese of Tarawa, Nauru and Funafuti was split on 10 September 1982 into the Diocese of Tarawa and Nauru and the Mission Sui Iuris of Funafuti.

Ordinaries 
(all Roman Rite, so far foreign missionary members of Latin Congregations)

Suffragan Ecclesiastical Superiors of Funafuti 
 Pio Taofinu'u, Marists (S. M.) (1982.09.10 – 1985.09), while Apostolic Administrator of Samoa–Pago-Pago bishopric (American Samoa) (1982.09.10 – 1986.06) and Metropolitan Archbishop of Samoa–Apia and Tokelau (Samoa) (1982.09.10 – 1992.06.26); previously Bishop of Apia (Samoa) (1968.01.11 – 1974.08.10), created Cardinal-Priest of S. Onofrio (1973.03.05 – 2006.01.19), Bishop of Samoa and Tokelau (Samoa) (1974.08.10 – 1982.09.10); later Metropolitan Archbishop of Samoa–Apia (Samoa) (1992.06.26 – retired 2002.11.16)
 John Hubert Macey Rodgers, S. M. (1985.08.07 - resigned 1986.07.14) 
 Camille DesRosiers, S. M. (1986.07.14 – retired 2010.09.24), no other mandate 
 John Ikataere Rarikin, Sacred Heart Missionaries (M. S. C.) (24 September 2010 - death 8 February 2014), no other mandate
 Reynaldo B. Getalado, Mission Society of the Philippines (M. S. P.) (24 February 2014 - ...), no other mandate

See also

References and External links

Sources and external links
 GCatholic, with incumbent bio links

Catholic Church in Tuvalu
Missions sui iuris
Roman Catholic Ecclesiastical Province of Suva
1982 establishments in Tuvalu